Uroš Krunić  (born 27 June 1994) is a Serbian football midfielder, who last played for Dinamo Vranje.

Club career

Sloga Kraljevo
Born in Kraljevo, Krunić is a product of Sloga Kraljevo youth academy. He made his senior debut for the club in the last fixture of the 2011–12 Serbian First League season, replacing Marko Gobeljić in 57 minute of the match against Kolubara. After he spent the whole next season with youth team, Krunić became fully senior since the beginning of the 2013–14 season. During the first half-season, he was used as a back-up at twice. Next he moved on a six-month loan to the Serbian League West side Partizan Bumbarevo Brdo in the winter break off-season. During the first half of the 2014–15 Serbian First League season, Krunić was out of the first team, missing to play any appearances until the end of 2014. At the beginning of 2015, he returned into the squad, collecting 3 appearances until the end of season. After a short spell with Inđija, Krunić moved back to Sloga for the spring half of the 2015–16 season. He noted 13 league appearances and scored a goal in 20 fixture against Železničar Lajkovac, when he was also elected for a man of the match. In summer 2016, Krunić left the club.

Inđija
In last days of the summer transfer window 2015, Krunić joined the Serbian First League club Inđija under coach Miloš Veselinović. After Veselinović left to Radnik Surdulica, Krunić was in protocol once time, but he spent that match on the bench. After the end of first half-season, he left club.

Later, in the winter break off-season Krunić was on trial at Radnički Kragujevac, but he left shortly after the club had been banned to sign new players.

Dinamo Vranje
At the beginning of 2017, Krunić joined Dinamo Vranje as a free agent. After he spent several matches on the bench as an unused substitution, Krunić made his debut for the club in 29 fixture match of the 2016–17 Serbian First League season against Sloboda Užice. Krunić left the club after the end of a season.

Career statistics

Club

References

1994 births
Living people
Sportspeople from Kraljevo
Serbian footballers
Association football midfielders
FK Sloga Kraljevo players
FK Inđija players
FK Dinamo Vranje players
Serbian First League players